Sega Rally 2006 is an arcade oriented racing game developed and published by Sega for PlayStation 2. It is the third installment in the decade running Sega Rally series, and it was released in Japan on January 12, 2006. This version is the first non-arcade-version–based Sega Rally. Its action footage was used in World Rally Championship.

Development
Sega initially planned the PlayStation 2 release date for 2005 as a 10-year anniversary celebration version, and was to be named "Sega Rally 2005", but the launch date was postponed. Several features have been removed from the previous Sega Rally 2 for Dreamcast, both Network Battle and two-player Battle multiplayer modes are not available anymore. The music genre has been changed from instrumental Hard Rock with classic tunes such as "Conditioned Reflex" (the 1996 "Plus" edition BGM being performed by the Japanese act "X-BAND") to Lo-Fi synthesizer driven pop becoming a key change in the series. When Sega Rally 2 offered 3ch Surround sound, the 2006 edition is only Stereo/Mono, which is a surprising backstep on a 6ch Dolby Digital/Pro Logic II capable machine.

Additionally, the depicted "fog" effect from Sega Rally 2, which was pointed to be a consequence of the use of Windows CE devkit, has been replaced by a heavy "clipping" effect. The increased speed in the driver's view can be explained by the removal of the rear view mirror. The change is also noticeable within the car selection.

Sega Rally Championship was introduced with '92 & '94 World Rally Championship winner cars, being both Didier Auriol's French flagged cars, the Sega Saturn version adding Sandro Munari's hidden Stratos HF Gr4 WRC '77. Sega Rally 2 Arcade followed this path with four WRC '97 cars: Carlos Sainz's Corolla WRC, Tommi Mäkinen's Lancer Evo IV WRC, Colin McRae's Impreza WRC, Gilles Panizzi's 306 Maxi plus, Ari Vatanen's Escort WRC '98 & Sandro Munari's Stratos HF Gr4 WRC '77. The original Celica & Delta from Sega Rally 1995 were hidden in the Arcade version. Due to its "10-year Championship" mode, Sega Rally 2 Dreamcast had added a large number of cars to the ones already available in the Arcade. Switching from Europe-based FIA (Fédération Internationale de l'Automobile) WRC (World Rally Championship) to North American–based SCCA (Sports Car Club of America) ProRally, the latter allowing more powerful specs, Sega Rally 2006 abandon all the vehicles from Sega Rally 2 to introduce a brand new selection. The three original 1995 classics, Celica WRC '94, Delta WRC '92 & Stratos WRC '77 being also included as hidden Extra cars. Some Sega Rally 2006 Open Class cars are Mark Lovell's Pikes Peak International HillClimb winning Impreza WRX ProRally '03 (the same model appearing in Enthusia Professional Racing), Tim O'Neil's Focus SVT ProRally '03 and the Lancer Evolution VIII MR ProRally '03.

Game modes
Sega Rally 2006 features three game modes: Career Mode, Arcade Mode and the classical Time Attack Mode:
 The Arcade Mode is based on checkpoints. The driver select between "Series 1" (Easy), "Series 2" (Normal) or "Series 3" (Hard) for a 4-stages championship with the goal to reach the pole position by the end of the series and to become the Champion. The driver starts each series from the 15th position and race on various predetermined weather/daytime conditions in European, Asian, African, North American, Scandinavian or Circuit rounds. It is possible to race the Arcade Mode with Professional, Extra or Career tuned cars. After completing the first Series, another set of stages is unlocked as "Series 4", "Series 5" & "Series 6". Beating this second set of stages unlocks the three "Extra" cars taken from Sega Rally Championship 1995.
 Career is Sega Rally 2006's core with four race types: 1on1 Versus CPU, Race against seven AI controlled cars, Time Attack & Total time series Rally. The Career mode is divided in two steps Amateur and Professional each one with its own "Open", "Class 1" & "Class 2" series. The "Sega Rally Championship" is only available once the driver has become Professional.

External links
Official website, Japan

2006 video games
PlayStation 2 games
PlayStation 2-only games
Rally racing video games
Sega video games
Off-road racing video games
Japan-exclusive video games
Video games scored by Hideki Naganuma
Video games scored by Hiroshi Kawaguchi
Video games scored by Jun Senoue
Video games scored by Richard Jacques
Video games scored by Takenobu Mitsuyoshi
Video games developed in Japan
Single-player video games